Moetzet Chachmei HaTorah (Hebrew: מועצת חכמי התורה; lit. "Council of [wise] Torah Sages") is the rabbinical body that has the ultimate authority in the Israeli ultra-orthodox  Sephardic and Mizrahi Shas Party.

History

The council was  established along with the establishment of Shas in 1982, in order to serve as the spiritual leadership of the new movement. As a new Haredi party, Shas followed in the footsteps of the Ashkenazi Agudat Yisrael and Moetzes Gedolei HaTorah and set up a similar mechanism. Upon its establishment the council became a new spiritual Sephardic-leadership in Israel, however, also enjoyed the leadership of the Ashkenazi Torah sages council especially the support of Rabbi Elazar Shach - a support that has stopped along with the independent decision of the council in 1990 that Shas would join the coalition government with the left (The dirty trick).

The members of the council decide on the list of candidates, coalition agreements and determine the political and diplomatic policies of Shas party.

Founder members of the council were  Sephardi Chief Rabbi of Israel Ovadia Yosef, Rabbi Shimon Baadani, Rabbi Shalom Cohen and Rabbi Shabtai Aton (whom following the cessation of support of the Ashkenazi Torah sages retired in 1990). The first secretary of the council was Rabbi Yechezkel Aschayek, a confidant of Rabbi Shach. Initially, the council was founded in order to ensure the remote control of Rabbi Shach over the Shas movement, and to ensure his position as the ultimate arbiter over fateful questions facing the Shas movement. Because of this, the rabbis Baadani, Toledano. and Aton were appointed to the council, whom all studied under Rabbi Shach over the years. Rabbi Shalom Cohen is also considered loyalist of Rabbi Shach. After Yechezkel Aschayek retired from Shas, he was replaced by Rabbi Moshe Maya (who later became a Knesset member and eventually became himself a member of the Council). Rabbi Ovadia Yosef served as president of the council, for 30 years. After Moshe Maya, Rafael Pinhasi served as council secretary for 14 years and had retired after the death of Rabbi Ovadia Yosef. Upon the death of his father, Rabbi Ovadia Yosef, David Yosef was appointed to the council.

Up until the death of  Rabbi Ovadia Yosef, The structure in Shas political authority was the same as that of Degel HaTorah. It was subject to the Sephardic Council of Torah Sages, and from the cessation of support of Rabbi Shach, headed solely by the leadership of Rabbi Ovadia Yosef. It was particularly true after the appointment of Eli Yishai as chairman of the Shas party.

Council members

As of 2023 the Members of the Sephardic Council of Torah Sages rabbis are:

Rabbi Moshe Maya
Rabbi David Yosef
Rabbi Reuven Elbaz

Council secretaries
Rabbi Yechezkel Aschayek (1982-1990)
Rabbi Moshe Maya (1990-1999)
Rabbi Rafael Pinhasi (1999-2013)
Rabbi Amir Krispal (Provisional)

See also
Ovadia Yosef
Moetzes Gedolei HaTorah - The Ashkenazi council

External links
Moetzet Chachmei HaTorah at Shas official website

References